"Where Corn Don't Grow" is a song written by Roger Murrah and Mark Alan Springer. It was first recorded by Waylon Jennings on his 1990 album The Eagle, peaking at #67 on the country singles charts that year. Six years later, Travis Tritt covered it on his 1996 album The Restless Kind. Also released as a single, his rendition was a Top Ten country hit in 1997, peaking at #6 on the same chart. On April 12, 2021, rising country star Riley Green released a cover of the song in an ode to both Tritt and Jennings.

Music video play this video
The music video for Tritt's version was directed by Michael Merriman. The video features a young man who leaves his father's farm in search of a life in the big city. The young man eventually has his guitar, wallet, and everything but his father's gold watch stolen. He steals food from a store because he has no money, but is caught and arrested. The young man is eventually revealed to be Tritt when he returns to his father's home with the gold watch.

Chart positions

Waylon Jennings

Travis Tritt
"Where Corn Don't Grow" debuted at number 73 on the U.S. Billboard Hot Country Singles & Tracks for the week of November 23, 1996.

Year-end charts

References

Waylon Jennings songs
1990 singles
Travis Tritt songs
1997 singles
Songs written by Roger Murrah
Song recordings produced by Don Was
Epic Records singles
Warner Records singles
Songs written by Mark Alan Springer
Song recordings produced by Bob Montgomery (songwriter)
1990 songs